Chocolate tea may refer to:
 Any variety of tea with chocolate in it
 The name in Nigeria used for hot cocoa